Branden is a given name. Notable people with the name include:

Branden Albert (born 1984), former American football offensive tackle
Branden Becker (born 1996), American professional baseball player
Branden Bowen (born 1996), American football player
Branden Campbell of Neon Trees, American rock band from Provo, Utah
Branden Dawson (born 1993), American professional basketball player
Branden Durst (born 1980), Democratic politician from Tacoma, Washington
Branden Grace (born 1988), professional golfer from South Africa
Branden Lee Hinkle (b. 1973), American mixed martial artist
Branden Jacobs-Jenkins (b. 1984), American playwright
Branden James (born 1978), American tenor
Branden W. Joseph, the Frank Gallipoli Professor of Modern and Contemporary Art in Columbia University
Branden Kline (born 1991), American professional baseball pitcher
Branden Ledbetter (born 1986), former American football tight end
Branden Oliver (born 1991), American football running back
Branden Ore (born 1986), former college football running back
Branden Petersen (born 1986), Minnesota politician and former member of the Minnesota Senate
Branden Pinder (born 1989), American professional baseball pitcher
Branden Saller of Atreyu, American metalcore band
Branden Shanahan (born 1969), Canadian professional ice hockey executive and former player
Branden Steineckert (born 1978), the drummer for the punk rock band Rancid
Branden Turepu (born 1990), footballer from the Cook Islands
Branden Whitehurst (born 1989), Virgin Islander swimmer

See also
Branden (surname)
Brandan, given name and surname
Brandon (given name)
Brandin, name

English masculine given names